Howard was a predominantly low income African-American neighborhood of Kendall, an unincorporated community and CDP located in Miami-Dade County, Florida, United States.  It is located just west of downtown Pinecrest, and just north of The Falls, a shopping mall.

Geography

References

Unincorporated communities in Miami-Dade County, Florida
Unincorporated communities in Florida